Hamatophyton verticillatum is a species of the extinct Sphenophyllales horsetails.

Description
Axes of this plant are pseudomonopodial with axial trichomes or spines and nodal whorls of sterile leaves.  Leaves are dimorphic and sometimes contain trichomes or spines. When mature, primary xylem is exarch and the secondary xylem lacks parenchyma.

References

Horsetails
Late Devonian plants
Mississippian plants
Late Devonian first appearances
Mississippian extinctions
Famennian life
Tournaisian life